Sandra Nyaira was a Zimbabwean investigative journalist and communications and public information officer at the United Nations Economic Commission for Africa headquarters in Addis Ababa, Ethiopia. Nyaira worked for Voice Of America (VOA) in Washington DC and her work also featured in the London Times, The Guardian and The British Journalism Review. Nyaira rose to fame after she became the first woman in Zimbabwe to take a leadership role in the newsroom at the age of 26 and also became more popular after she got arrested for exposing corrupt officials through an article she published.

In April 2001 she wrote articles accusing Robert Mugabe and the then parliamentary speaker Emmerson Mnangagwa of corruption, and again she was charged with criminal defamation that year.

Nyaira has been a Shorenstein fellow at Harvard University.

On 13 July 2021, it was reported that Nyaira had died of a COVID-19 related illness.

References 

Zimbabwean journalists
Zimbabwean women journalists
Living people
Year of birth missing (living people)